Afonso Cruz (1971), born in Figueira da Foz, is a portuguese multidisciplinary artist, author of more than 30 books, among novels, theatre plays, picture books, juvenile novellas, poetry, photo-text and essays.

His books are published in more than 20 languages, and received many awards, like the EU Prize for Literature. for the novel Kokoschka’s Doll. He is also a columnist, illustrator and member of the band The Soaked Lamb.

References

1971 births
People from Figueira da Foz
Portuguese musicians
Portuguese male musicians
Portuguese male novelists
Living people
21st-century Portuguese novelists